Jake Gray may refer to:

Jake Gray (politician)
Jake Gray, character in Devour (film)
Jake Gray (footballer) (born 1995), English football player